A Universal History of Infamy, or A Universal History of Iniquity (original Spanish title: Historia universal de la infamia), is a collection of short stories by Jorge Luis Borges, first published in 1935, and revised by the author in 1954. Most were published individually in the newspaper Crítica between 1933 and 1934. Angel Flores, the first to use the term "magical realism", set the beginning of the movement with this book.

The stories (except Hombre de la esquina rosada) are fictionalised accounts of real criminals. The sources are listed at the end of the book, but Borges makes many alterations in the retelling—arbitrary or otherwise—particularly to dates and names, so the accounts cannot be relied upon as historical. In particular, The Disinterested Killer diverges from its source material.

Two English translations exist, the first from 1972 and the second from 1999 (part of a collected edition, published as a separate book in 2004). The 1972 English edition (A Universal History of Infamy) was translated by Norman Thomas di Giovanni. The 2004 English edition (A Universal History of Iniquity), translated by Andrew Hurley, was published by Penguin Classics, a division of British publisher Penguin Books.

Borges was reluctant to authorise a translation. In his preface to the 1954 edition, Borges distanced himself somewhat from the book, which he gave as an example of the baroque, "when art flaunts and squanders its resources"; he wrote that the stories are "the irresponsible sport of a shy sort of man who could not bring himself to write short stories, and so amused himself by changing and distorting (sometimes without aesthetic justification) the stories of other men" and that "there is nothing beneath all the storm and the lightning."

Contents

See also

Bibliography of Jorge Luis Borges

References

1935 short story collections
Fantasy short story collections
Short story collections by Jorge Luis Borges
Postmodern novels